The  Oberlin String Quartet is a classical music ensemble associated with the Oberlin Conservatory of Music at Oberlin College, Oberlin, Ohio.

In 1955, violinist and Oberlin Conservatory faculty member Andor Toth formed the Oberlin String Quartet with violinist Matthew Raimondi, violist William Berman, and cellist John Frazer. In 1957, violinist John Dalley (second violinist in the Guarneri Quartet), and cellist Peter Howard  (for many years principal cellist in the Saint Paul Chamber Orchestra) joined the Quartet.

The quartet disbanded after Andor Toth left the faculty in 1959.

Award 
In late summer 1958, the Oberlin String Quartet toured Germany and Belgium, then won fourth prize in the Concours International de Quatuor. The competition was sponsored by H.M. Queen Elizabeth Music Competition, and held in Liège, Belgium. No first prize was awarded.

References 

American string quartets
Musical groups from Ohio
Musical groups established in 1955
Musical groups disestablished in 1959
Oberlin College
1955 establishments in Ohio